Pierini is a tribe of butterflies within the family Pieridae. 

Pierini may also refer to:
 Pierini (surname), Italian surname

See also 

 Perini (disambiguation)
 Pierino (disambiguation)